Ding Lei (born October 1963), also known as David Ding, the former president of Shanghai General Motors, is a Chinese automotive entrepreneur and CEO of HiPhi EV. He has served as the founder and chairman of Human Horizons since 2017. From August 2013 to July 2015, Ding was appointed as the Deputy governor of Pudong New District in Shanghai.

Early life and education 
Born in Shanghai in October, 1963, Ding graduated with a Bachelor of Science degree in nuclear physics, and a Master of Science degree in solid-state physics, from Fudan University respectively. In 2003, he earned an EMBA degree at China Europe International Business School.

Career 
In 1988, Ding Lei joined Shanghai Volkswagen, a joint venture of Volkswagen Group. From 2005 to 2011, he was the CEO of Shanghai General Motors (SGM), and SAIC-GM’s president from 2005 to 2007. He participated in the establishment of Shanghai General Motors in 1995, overseeing the acquisition of MG Rover by the SAIC in 2002.

From 2011 to 2015, Ding served in the Shanghai government departments, successively as the Executive Deputy Director and Director of the Shanghai Zhangjiang High-Tech Park Administrative Committee, and the Deputy Mayor of Pudong New Area.

Since August 2017, Ding has been the Chairman of Human Horizons, as well as East Coast Capital.

References

1963 births
Living people
Businesspeople from Shanghai
Fudan University alumni
Chinese computer businesspeople